Abisare ruled the ancient West Asian city-state of Larsa from 1841 BC to 1830 BC. He was an Amorite. The annals of his 11-year reign record that he smote Isin in his 9th regnal year.

See also

Chronology of the ancient Near East

Notes

External links
Abisare Year Names at CDLI

Sumerian kings
19th-century BC Sumerian kings
Kings of Larsa
19th-century BC people